Kirikuküla is a village in Antsla Parish, Võru County in Estonia.

Urvaste church dates from the early 14th century and is the only medieval rural church in Estonia built in the form of a basilica. The interior dates mainly from the late 19th century.

Marie Heiberg had some of her education in the village. A memorial to Marie Heiberg which includes a bust of her has been erected beside Urvaste church.

References

Villages in Võru County
Antsla Parish